The Rising Star Award (previously Critics' Choice Award) is an award given by the British Phonographic Industry (BPI), an organisation which represents record companies and artists in the United Kingdom. The accolade is presented at the Brit Awards, an annual celebration of British and international music. The winners and nominees are determined by the Brit Awards voting academy with over one-thousand members comprising record labels, publishers, managers, agents, media, and previous winners and nominees.

The nominees are British artists who the academy believe will make the biggest impact on music in the coming year. The award was first presented at the 28th Brit Awards in 2008 to Adele and has been awarded annually since. Tom Odell was the first male recipient, winning in 2013. FLO are the current holders of the award, winning in 2023.

Winners and nominees

Notes
 Sam Smith (2015), Rag'n'Bone Man (2017) also won the Brit Award for Best New Artist
 Adele (2012, 2016), Emeli Sandé (2013, 2017), Ellie Goulding (2014) also won the Brit Award for British Female Solo Artist
 James Bay (2016) also won the Brit Award for British Male Solo Artist
 Adele (2022) also won the Brit Award for British Artist of the Year
 Sam Fender (2022) also won the Brit Award for British Rock Act

References

Brit Awards
Music awards for breakthrough artist
Awards established in 2008